Marisa Mori (March 9, 1900 – March 6, 1985) was an Italian painter and printmaker. She was one of the few female artists in the Futurism movement.

Early life and education
Marisa Mori was born in Florence as Maria Luisa Lurini. Her father, Mario Lurini, was working for Fondiaria-Sai, an insurance company. Her mother, Edmea Bernini, was a distant descendant of sculptor Gian Lorenzo Bernini. In 1918 the family moved to Turin, where Marisa was encouraged to take up art by family friend and artist Leonardo Bistolfi. She enrolled in a private college founded and directed by Felice Casorati, attending from 1925 to 1931. In 1920 she married Mario Mori, a poet and journalist, and decided to adopt his surname. In 1922 their son, Franco, was born. In 1926 she exhibited her work in a group show at Fondazione Palazzo Bricherasio with other fellow students, including Nella Marchesini, Daphne Mabel Maugham, Paola Levi-Montalcini and Lalla Romano. Casorati's influence was very evident in Maria's work during this time.

Futurism
Mori became involved with the Futurist movement, joining the group led by Filippo Tommaso Marinetti in 1931. She was the only woman to contribute to The Futurist Cookbook in 1932. She was invited to the first National Futurist Exhibition in Rome in 1932, and soon after left Turin to return to live in Florence with her husband. In 1934 and 1936 she was invited to the Venice Biennale. She became very involved with Aeropittura (Aeropainting), winning a Silver Medal for a triptych she exhibited in a 1932 Futurist Art Prize at Galleria Bardi in Rome. In 1937 her work was included in the exhibition Les femmes artistes d’Europe at the Galerie nationale du Jeu de Paume in paris, later to travel to the Metropolitan Museum of Art in New York. Towards the late 1930s, Mori became disenfranchised with the Futurist movement due to its enthusiasm for fascism – a position that made her the subject of heavy criticism from her contemporaries. In 1938 she vehemently protested against the publication of the Manifesto of Race. She would later give hospitality to Rita Levi Montalcini and her brother Gino Levi Montalcini, who were both affected by Italian racial laws from 1938 to 1943. In 1943, at the eve of the outbreak of Civil War, Mario Mori died.

Later life and death
After the end of the war, Mori moved back to Florence and returned to classical and natural themes, creating still-life's, nudes and masks. In 1951 she exhibited a new painting at the VI Rome Quadriennale. In 1954 she had a solo show at the House of Dante Alighieri in Florence. In the following years Mori fundamentally retired from public life, only appearing sporadically at events such as the exhibitions for women artists organised by her Florentine Lyceum. Mori died in 1985 in Florence, three days before her 85th birthday.

Notes

References

1900 births
1985 deaths
Artists from Florence
20th-century Italian painters
Italian women painters
Modern painters
Futurist painters
Italian Futurist painters
20th-century Italian women artists